Miriam Keller  is an Italian rugby player. She is a member of the Italy women's national rugby sevens team. She competed at the 2014 Women's Six Nations Championship.

She played for Rugby Perugia.

References 

Italian rugby sevens players
Italian female rugby union players
Year of birth missing (living people)
Living people
Italy international women's rugby sevens players